Sabrina Paola Garciarena (born July 19, 1983) is an Argentine actress and model.

Biography 
Sabrina Paola Garciarena was born on Julissa 19, 1983 in Ramos Mejía, Buenos Aires, Argentina. She is the daughter of Susana and Osvaldo. She has one brother and three sisters. Sabrina Garciarena studied at Colegio Don Bosco. Sabrina is Roman Catholic.

Personal life 
Sabrina Garciarena does not like to speak publicly about her private life.

Since 2009, Sabrina Garciarena is in a relationship with the journalist Germán Paoloski. On April 1, 2014, she gave birth to the couple's first child, a boy, whom they called León Paoloski, who was born in the Clínica Maternidad Suizo Argentina. On May 22, 2017, Beltrán Paoloski was born by Caesarean section, who was born in the Clínica Maternidad Suizo Argentina. On May 5, 2020, she gave birth to the couple's third child, a girl, whom they called Mía Paoloski. Sabrina Garciarena lives in Buenos Aires, Argentina with Germán Paoloski and her children.

Career 
Sabrina Garciarena first steps were in Verano del '98 in 1998.

After a few years in her native Argentina, Sabrina traveled to Spain to succeed as an actress. She changed managers and made several castings.

In 2007, she starred in the movie Tocar el cielo.

In 2008, in Spain, she shot the series Cuestión de sexo with Diego Peretti and in the cinema, shared prominence with the Spanish actor and comedian Gorka Otxoa in Pagafantas.

In 2009, she returned to Argentina to star in the movie Felicitas from Teresa Costantini. For this work she has won the Silver Condor Award as a Female Revelation. In 2009 she participated in a charity album for Sahara schools with the song Chas! y aparezco a tu lado  next to the group Supersubmarina for Sony Music.

From 2010 to 2012, she starred in the miniseries Terra ribelle issued by Rai 1 set in 19th century, together with Anna Favella and Rodrigo Guirao Díaz. In 2012, she finished filming the miniseries Terra ribelle and the same producer proposed to travel to Tunisia to film L`ombra del destino.

In 2011, she worked in Spain in Física o Química issued by Antena 3. In 2011, she debuted in the first episode of television series Maltratadas.

Sabrina, is the protagonist of the video clip Sin ti, sin mí from Ricardo Arjona and Sabrina participated in the video clip Hasta cuando from Diego Torres.

In 2015, she starred with Benjamín Vicuña the movie Baires.

In 2016, she starred in the television series Los ricos no piden permiso with Araceli González, Luciano Castro, Agustina Cherri, Gonzalo Heredia, Juan Darthes, Eva De Dominici, Nicolás Riera and Laura Laprida.

In 2017, she made a participation in the television series Golpe al corazón.

In 2018, she made her musical comedy debut in the classic  El violinista en el tejado starring opposite Raúl Lavié.

Filmography

Television

Movies

Theater

Videoclips

Awards and nominations

References

External links
 

Argentine female models
Living people
1983 births
Actresses from Buenos Aires
People from Ramos Mejía
21st-century Argentine women